Spaatz Island is a large ice-covered island of Antarctica.

The north side of the island forms a portion of the south margin of Ronne Entrance; the remainder of the island is surrounded by the ice shelves of Stange Sound and George VI Sound. Finn Ronne and Carl Eklund of the US Antarctic Service (USAS) (1939–41) sledged along the north side of this feature in December 1940. It was photographed from the air and first mapped as an island by the Ronne Antarctic Research Expedition (RARE) (1947–48) under Finn Ronne. It was named by Ronne for Gen. Carl Spaatz, Chief of Staff, USAAF, who gave assistance in providing an airplane for use of RARE.

See also 
 Composite Antarctic Gazetteer
 List of Antarctic and sub-Antarctic islands
 List of Antarctic islands south of 60° S 
 SCAR
 Territorial claims in Antarctica

References

External links

Islands of Palmer Land